Ross is a city in Mountrail County, North Dakota, United States. The population was 95 at the 2020 census.

History
Ross was founded in 1902. It was the site of the first structure built in the United States specifically intended to serve as a mosque.  Established in 1929, the mosque fell into disrepair and was dismantled.   In 2005, the edifice was rebuilt by the family of one of the last remaining Muslims in the area. The community that built the mosque were Syrian-Lebanese immigrants who settled the region starting in the late 19th century to take advantage of the Homestead Act.  The mosque was featured on NPR's Weekend Edition on September 12, 2010.

Geography
Ross is located at  (48.313105, -102.543263).

Demographics

2010 census
As of the census of 2010, there were 97 people, 46 households, and 23 families residing in the city. The racial makeup of the city was 94.8% White, 4.1% Native American, and 1.0% from two or more races. Hispanic or Latino of any race were 2.1% of the population.

There were 46 households, of which 17.4% had children under the age of 18 living with them, 43.5% were married couples living together, 6.5% had a male householder with no wife present, and 50.0% were non-families. 34.8% of all households were made up of individuals, and 4.3% had someone living alone who was 65 years of age or older. The average household size was 2.11 and the average family size was 2.57.

The median age in the city was 36.5 years. 15.5% of residents were under the age of 18; 13.3% were between the ages of 18 and 24; 30.9% were from 25 to 44; 34.1% were from 45 to 64; and 6.2% were 65 years of age or older. The gender makeup of the city was 59.8% male and 40.2% female.

2000 census
As of the census of 2000, there were 48 people, 24 households, and 13 families residing in the city. The population density was 169.6 people per square mile (66.2/km). There were 29 housing units at an average density of 102.5 per square mile (40.0/km). The racial makeup of the city was 97.92% White and 2.08% Native American.

There were 24 households, out of which 20.8% had children under the age of 18 living with them, 50.0% were married couples living together, 4.2% had a female householder with no husband present, and 45.8% were non-families. 41.7% of all households were made up of individuals, and 12.5% had someone living alone who was 65 years of age or older. The average household size was 2.00 and the average family size was 2.62.

In the city, the population was spread out, with 14.6% under the age of 18, 14.6% from 18 to 24, 22.9% from 25 to 44, 27.1% from 45 to 64, and 20.8% who were 65 years of age or older. The median age was 44 years. For every 100 females, there were 92.0 males. For every 100 females age 18 and over, there were 105.0 males.

The median income for a household in the city was $18,750, and the median income for a family was $28,750. Males had a median income of $16,875 versus $14,250 for females. The per capita income for the city was $15,025. There were no families and 5.3% of the population living below the poverty line, including no under eighteens and none of those over 64.

Further reading
 William C. Sherman, Paul L. Whitney and John Guerrero. Prairie Peddlers – The Syrian-Lebanese in North Dakota (2002). University of Mary Press.

References

Cities in North Dakota
Lebanese-American history
Cities in Mountrail County, North Dakota
Populated places established in 1902
Syrian-American history
1902 establishments in North Dakota